Santopadre is a surname. Notable people with the surname include: 

Alessandro Santopadre (born 1998), Italian football player
Frank Santopadre, American comedy writer and producer
Vincenzo Santopadre (born 1971), Italian tennis player

Italian-language surnames